Babacar Guèye (born 31 December 1994) is a Senegalese professional footballer who plays as a forward.

Career
On 31 January 2022, after half a year with the club, Guèye agreed the termination of his contract with Erzgebirge Aue which was to run until 2023.

On 8 February 2022, Guèye signed a 1.5-year contract with Kocaelispor in Turkey.

On 3 August 2022, Guèye joined Saudi Arabian club Ohod on a free transfer.

Career statistics

Club

Honours
Zulte Waregem
 Belgian Cup: 2017

References

1994 births
Living people
Association football forwards
Senegalese footballers
Ligue 1 players
Ligue 2 players
2. Bundesliga players
Belgian Pro League players
Bundesliga players
TFF First League players
Saudi First Division League players
ES Troyes AC players
Hannover 96 players
Hannover 96 II players
S.V. Zulte Waregem players
Sint-Truidense V.V. players
SC Paderborn 07 players
Karlsruher SC players
FC Erzgebirge Aue players
Kocaelispor footballers
Ohod Club players
Senegalese expatriate footballers
Senegalese expatriate sportspeople in France
Expatriate footballers in France
Senegalese expatriate sportspeople in Germany
Expatriate footballers in Germany
Senegalese expatriate sportspeople in Belgium
Expatriate footballers in Belgium
Senegalese expatriate sportspeople in Turkey
Expatriate footballers in Turkey
Senegalese expatriate sportspeople in Saudi Arabia
Expatriate footballers in Saudi Arabia